Yeniseysk Governorate    was a governorate (guberniya) of the Russian Empire and later of the Russian Republic,  Russian Socialist Federative Soviet Republic in 1822-1925.

General information 

The Governorate was established on January 26 (February 7), 1822 when the territory of Siberia General Governorate was divided into two governorates general: West-Siberian and East-Siberian  according to the decree  of Alexander I "On the division of Siberia into two general governments"   of the administrative reform under the project of Mikhail Speransky.

On July 22 (August 3), 1822, the Yeniseysk Governorate   with the administrative center of Krasnoyarsk was separated from the Tomsk Governorate to become a part of East-Siberian Governorate General.

The Yeniseysk Governorate    were located in the western part of Eastern Siberia between 52° 20' and 77° 33' north latitude and 95° and 128° east longitude. It stretched from the southern to the northern limits of the Russian Empire. The area looked like an irregular polygon, elongated in the direction from the southwest to the northeast. The greatest length of the Yeniseysk Governorate from China to the extreme northern tip of Asia (a cape in the east of the Taymyr Peninsula) is 2800 verst, the greatest width from west to east is up to 1300 verst. In the north, the Yeniseysk Governorate was bounded by the Northern Ocean, In the northeast by the Vilyuysk okrug  of the Yakutsk Oblast, in the east and southeast by the Kirensky Uyezd and Nizhneudinsky Uyezd of the Irkutsk Governorate; in south by China. In the west,  Yeniseysk Governorate bordered on West Siberian General Governorate. In the southwest and west with the Kuznetskiy Okrug, Marinsky Uezd and Narymsky  of the Tomsk Governorate, from the northwest with the Beryozovsky Uezd of the Tobolsk Governorate.

The area of the Yeniseysk Governorate was 2,211,589 square verst (the second largest province, after the Yakutsk Oblast).

Coat of arms of the Yeniseysk Governorate 

“In a scarlet shield, a golden lion with azure eyes and tongue, and black claws, holding the same sickle in its right paw. The shield is surmounted by the imperial crown and surrounded by golden oak leaves connected by St. Andrew's ribbon.
The coat of arms of the Yenisei Governorate was approved on July 5, 1878  by the All-Russian Emperor Alexander II. In 1886, decorations were removed from the city shields by the armorial department under the Department of Heraldry.
The lion symbolized strength and courage, and the sickle and shovel reflected the main occupation of the inhabitants - agriculture and mining, primarily gold.

History

17th century 
Until 1629, the territory of the modern Krasnoyarsk Krai was part of a vast region with the center in the city of Tobolsk. Later, the ostrog (fortress) of Yeniseisk, Krasnoyarsk and Kansk with adjacent lands were assigned to the Tomsk razryad.

In 1676, the Yeniseisk ostrog received the status of a city, under which all the settlements along the Yenisei river and the right-bank territories stretching to Transbaikal were transferred.

18th century 

Peter I in 1708 carried out territorial and administrative transformations to streamline the administration of the state. The main administrative unit of the Russian Empire was the Governorate, which included provinces, divided into uezds. According to the Decree of December 18, 1708, the entire territory of the Russian Empire was divided into eight provinces. Siberia and part of the Urals became part of the Siberia Governorate with the center in the city of Tobolsk.

Due to the long distances, the lack of means of communication, the administration of the territories of the Siberia Governorate was extremely difficult. There was a need for territorial transformations. In 1719, three provinces were established as part of the Siberia Governorate: Vyatka, Solikamsk and Tobolsk, and five years later two more - Irkutsk Governorate and Yeniseisk Governorate with a center in the city of Yeniseisk. The Yeniseisk Governorate included the following uezds (listed as towns): Mangazeya, Yeniseysk, Krasny Yar, Tomskoy, Kuznetskoy, Narym and Ketsk.

In 1764, by decree of Catherine II, the territory of Siberia was subjected to another administrative-territorial reform: a second Governorate was established - Irkutsk Governorate, which included the Yeniseisk Governorate. Two decades later, the Yeniseisk Governorate was liquidated, its uezds were included in three Governorate: Tobolsk (Yeniseisk and Achinsk), Irkutsk and Kolyvan (Krasnoyarsk).

In 1797, all the territories of the Yenisei River basin were assigned to the Tobolsk Governorate (until 1804; then, until 1822, they were part of the Tomsk Governorate).

19th century 

In order to centralize management in 1803, the Siberian General Governorate was created with the center in the city of Irkutsk, which absorbed the territories of Tobolsk Governorate, Irkutsk Governorate and Tomsk Governorate.

In 1822, this system of territorial subordination was abolished, and the West Siberian General Governorate (center Tobolsk) and East Siberian General Governorate  (center Irkutsk) were created instead. The Siberian people belonged to the inorodtsy class and their nomadic status was confirmed by a special system of self-government "steppe duma - foreign government - tribal government", in accordance with the "Charter on the management of foreigners".

At the same time, at the suggestion of M. M. Speransky, who was conducting an audit of the Siberian possessions, Emperor Alexander I signed a decree on the formation of the Yeniseysk Governorate as part of five districts: Krasnoyarsk, Yeniseisk (with Turukhansk Territory), Achinsk, Minusinsk and Kansk. The city of Krasnoyarsk was approved as the administrative center of the newly formed province.

On February 26, 1831, the Senate issued a decree "On the organization of the post office in the Yeniseysk Governorate". A provincial post office was established in Krasnoyarsk, postal expeditions were established in Yeniseisk and Achinsk, and post offices were opened in Kansk, Minusinsk and Turukhansk.

For 50 years after the creation of the Yeniseysk Governorate, minor changes took place in the administrative structure of the Russian Empire: in 1879, the okrug (districts) were renamed uezd (counties). The territory of the Yeniseysk Governorate did not undergo any changes and basically coincided with the borders of the modern Krasnoyarsk Krai.
In 1886, the Usinsky border okrug (Usinsky Krai) was separated from Minusinsk Uyezd.

In 1882 Ob-Yenisei channel construction started and opened for navigation of small ships in 1891.

In 1892 Charles Vapereau made a journey from Beijing to Paris through Siberia published about his travel in journal with drawings and engravings from his photos.

20th century  

Since 1913, the Yeniseysk Governorate had been part of the Irkutsk Governor General.

In the summer of 1913, Fridtjof Nansen travelled to the Kara Sea, by the invitation of Jonas Lied, as part of a delegation: Vostrotin Stepan Vasilyevich (Siberian public figure, polar explorer, politician and diplomat), Iosif Grigorievich Loris-Melikov (secretary of the Russian mission in Norway), etc,  investigating a possible  Northern Sea trade Route between Western Europe and the Siberian interior. The party then took the barge «Turukhansk»  up the Yenisei River to Krasnoyarsk, and  then through China along the Chinese Eastern Railway reached Vladivostok, on the way stopped in Khabarovsk, where he met a famous Russian traveler, explorer of the Ussuri region, Lieutenant Colonel Vladimir Arseniev, from where he returned by cars, horses and at that time the unfinished northern route of the Trans-Siberian Railway to Norway through Yekaterinburg, where he participated in a meeting of the Russian Geographical Society, reporting on the voyage along the Yenisei. Nansen published a report from thу journey in book Through Siberia .

In 1913 the Usinsk border okrug was transformed into the Usinsk-Uriankhai Krai.

On April 17, 1914, the Russian government establishes a protectorate over Uryankhay Krai (conforming roughly to the territory of modern Tuva), which became part of the Yeniseysk Governorate.

In the summer 1914  Norwegian expedition (Henrik Printz,  botanist, Orjan Olsen, ornithologist, Anders Olsen, Fritz Jensen, zoological assistant, photographer, and  Josif Ermilowitsch Gutschin assistant with archaeological and anthropological collections local Russian from Minusinsk) was exploring  southern  Siberia  and  north-western  Mongolia "the  so-called  Urjankai  country,  a  tract  of  land  about  the  sources  of  the  Yenisei,  as yet  almost  entirely  unknown"  "terra incognita" as it was described in resulting books  "The vegetation of the Siberian-Mongolian frontiers: (the Sayansk region)"  and  "To Jenisei's sources. The Norwegian Sibirie Expedition's journey".

In 1914, an ethnographic expedition from the museums of Oxford and Pennsylvania made a trip along the Yenisei, consisting of anthropologist Maria Czaplicka, anthropologist Henry Usher Hall, ornithologist Maud Doria Haviland, Dora Curtis painter, Vasily Korobeinikov. The researchers traveled overland to Krasnoyarsk, along the Trans-Siberian Railway and on the "Oryol" steamer climbed the Yenisei to the mouth of the Golchikha, where they spent the summer studying the nature and beliefs of the indigenous peoples of Siberia.

A similar administrative-territorial division persisted until the early 1920s.

Uryankhay Krai existed until August 14, 1921, when local revolutionaries, supported by the Red Army of the RSFSR, decided to proclaim the national sovereignty of Tuvan People's Republic.   Apart from Mongolia, however, no other country recognized its independence.

Since 1923, work began on the zoning of Siberia, which marked the beginning of the administrative reorganization of the territory of the region. Volosts were abolished, enlarged uezds (districts) were created.

On November 14, 1923, parts of the Yeniseysk governorate's Minusinsky and Achinsky Uezds were merged with one volost of Kuznetskiy Uyezd of Tomsk Governorate to form new Khakassky Uezd.  On March 19, 1924, Siberian Revolutionary Committee (Sibrevkom) approved the enlargement of the Yeniseysk governorate's uezds (districts).

The Usinsk okrug was formed in 1924 as part of the Yeniseisk Governorate, but already in 1925 it became part of the Minusinsk okrug of the Siberian Krai,

On June 23, 1924, new Turukhansky Uezd was formed in the governorate.  Its Yuzhnaya Volost was formed on the part of the territory of Antsiferovskaya Volost of Yeniseysky Uezd.  After that, Yeniseysky Uezd itself was abolished and its remaining territory split between Kansky and Krasnoyarsky Uezds.  At the same time, Daurskaya Volost of Achinsky Uezd was transferred to Krasnoyarsky Uezd.

Also in 1924, parts of Znamenskaya and Tashtypskaya Volosts of Minusinsky Uezd were transferred to Khakassky Uezd.  The former territory became a part of Charkovskaya Enlarged Volost, while the latter was merged into Tashtypskaya Enlarged Volost.

On May 25, 1925, all Governorates (including Yeniseysk Governorate) and regions in Siberia are abolished by the decree of the All-Russian Central Executive Committee, their territories are merged into a single Siberian Krai, with the center in Novosibirsk, along with the territories of Oyrat Autonomous Oblast and Altai, Novo-Nikolayevsk, Omsk, and Tomsk Governorates.  Achinsky, Kansky, Krasnoyarsky, Minusinsky, and Khakassky Uezds of the  governorate were at the same time transformed into okrugs, while Turukhansky Uezd was renamed Turukhansky Krai and transferred to Krasnoyarsk Okrug.

Administrative division 
As of its foundation, the governorate included five okrugs (districts)  from former uezd (counties):
 Krasnoyarsk;
 Yeniseysk (included the territory of the abolished Turukhansky Krai).
 Achinsky (from western part of Krasnoyarsky Uezd, south-west of the Yenisei Uezd and north-east of Tomsky Uezd);
 Minusinsky (separated from the southern part of the Krasnoyarsky Uezd);
 Kansky (from parts of the Krasnoyarsky Uezd,  Yenisei Uezd, Ilan volost and Biryusinsk volost of the Nizhneudinsky Uezd of the Irkutsk Governorate from the Biryusa river to the Kan river);
The administrative-territorial division of the Yenisei province remained basically unchanged until 1924. Only the volost division changed.

The number of volosts in the province is 35. Turukhansky Krai is divided into 3 sections, the same volosts.

Since 1898, the okrugs (districts) of the Yenisei Governorate were again called uezd (counties).

At the end of the 19th century, the Yeniseysk Governorate included 5  uezds  (since 1898 - okrugs) and the Turukhansky Krai.

Population 
In the 1760s-1780s, exile to Siberia became widespread. In the 1820s, the exiles constituted the second largest group of residents of Minusinsk. In 1863, 44,994 exiles lived in the Yeniseisk Governorate, which was 1/7 of the entire population of the province.

In the second half of the 19th - early 20th centuries. the formation of the population of the Yeniseisk Governorate occurred as a result of both ongoing spontaneous and organized migration processes. According to the results of the General Census of 1897, the Russian-speaking population, consisting of Siberians  - the Starozhily (Russian: старожилы, lit. 'Old-Timers, Old-Settlers') and later settlers "Raseyskie" , prevailed, and the bulk of the inorodtsy population, consisting of indigenous peoples of Siberia.

According to the 1897 census, 570.2 thousand people lived in the province, including 62.9 thousand people in cities (11.7%). The religious composition was dominated by Orthodox - 93.8%, there were also Old Believers - 2.1%, Catholics - 1.1%, Jews - 1.1%, Muslims - 0.8% Lutherans - 0.7%.

Literate - 13.7%.

The estimated population in 1906 was almost entirely Russian, the rest (about 10%) consisting of Samoyedes, Tatars, Tunguses, Yakuts, Mongols and Ostyaks

Fun facts 
In the 19th century, the inhabitants of the coastal villages between Yeniseisk and Krasnoyarsk had the custom to call out to all ships and rafts passing by. The call was made in a singsong voice, in a drawling voice: “and who is swimming, and who is swimming, and who is swimming by name?”. Sailors had to respond and report their name or shout "good people." If they did not do this, residents immediately sailed from the shores in boats, inspected the ships, asking if there was anything “unallowed”

See also 
 Tunguska event (1908)
 
 Nansen's Siberia expedition, 1913

References

Архивный отдел Новосибирского облисполкома. Государственный архив Новосибирской области. "Административно-территориальное деление Сибири (август 1920 г. - июль 1930 г.), Западной Сибири (июль 1930 г. - сентябрь 1937 г.), Новосибирской области (с сентября 1937 г.) (Справочник)." Западно-Сибирское книжное издательство, Новосибирск, 1966

 
Governorates of the Russian Empire
States and territories established in 1822
1925 disestablishments
1820s establishments in the Russian Empire
History of Siberia
Governorates of the Russian Soviet Federative Socialist Republic
1822 establishments in the Russian Empire